Utricularia striatula is a small carnivorous plant that belongs to the genus Utricularia. It is widespread from tropical Africa to New Guinea. It was originally described by James Edward Smith in 1819.

See also 
 List of Utricularia species

References 

striatula
Flora of Angola
Flora of Burundi
Flora of Cameroon
Flora of Chad
Flora of China
Flora of Ivory Coast
Flora of Equatorial Guinea
Flora of Ethiopia
Flora of Gabon
Flora of Ghana
Flora of Guinea
Flora of Liberia
Flora of Nigeria
Flora of the Gulf of Guinea islands
Flora of Sierra Leone
Flora of Tanzania
Flora of tropical Asia
Flora of the Central African Republic
Flora of the Democratic Republic of the Congo
Flora of Uganda
Flora of Zambia
Carnivorous plants of Africa
Carnivorous plants of Asia
Plants described in 1819